Brisbane Square is a high-rise building in Brisbane, Queensland, Australia. The building has 38 floors and rises to 151 metres. The building's main use is for office space, the lower floors leased to retailers, with a 350-space car park below the building. Significant tenants include the Brisbane City Council (floors 1-23) and Australian Retirement Trust (floors 24-37).

Brisbane Square is situated on the block bounded by William Street, George Street, Queen Street and Adelaide Street. The building faces the Conrad Treasury Casino on Queen Street and formerly, the Law Courts Complex on Adelaide Street.

Design

Brisbane Square is owned by ABN AMRO and was designed by international architects Denton Corker Marshall. The Civil and Structural engineers for the project were Qantec McWilliam consulting engineers. Two of the four distinctive, rectangular, coloured spaces near the base of the building contain the new Brisbane City Council and Brisbane Square Library. Brisbane Square is the largest commercial office building in Australia to have been awarded a 5 star Green Star rating. The original development application included a number of residential floors on the top of the building, however this was rejected on the basis that noise levels would be excessive.

Construction
Construction was completed in late 2006. The project was constructed by Baulderstone Hornibrook.

Tenants 
The Brisbane City Council operates a public library in Brisbane Square.

See also

List of tallest buildings in Brisbane
Brisbane Square Tower 2

References

External links

World Architecture News

Skyscrapers in Brisbane
Office buildings completed in 2006
Office buildings in Brisbane
Queen Street, Brisbane
William Street, Brisbane
George Street, Brisbane
Adelaide Street, Brisbane
2006 establishments in Australia
Skyscraper office buildings in Australia
Retail buildings in Queensland
Modernist architecture in Australia